Kilos Pronto (Front Act) was a public service program patterned after the demise of T3 hosted by the Tulfo Brothers on TV5 on April 30, 2016. It was first aired on October 10, 2016 on UNTV with Ben Tulfo, former ABS-CBN News anchor and DWIZ host Alex Santos and former UNTV and PTV/NBN 4 anchor Nikka Cleofe-Alejar (deceased), the latter left the show in December of that year.

On January 23, 2017, KP moves on its present channel, the PTV, which also currently airs Bitag and Pinoy US Cops since 2013, as well the day that Santos become the anchor for PTV News 1:00 PM Edition (now Sentro Balita). On May 11, 2017, Ben's younger brother Erwin joined the program (initially, as a guest host but later became regular addition) after he resigned as anchor for TV5's news program Aksyon and a week later they move on its current timeslot at 5:00 p.m. (UTC +08) before PTV News. On September 18, 2017, KP began its simulcast over DZSR Radyo Pilipinas 2 918 AM.

Ben coined the program as an "Hybrid Public Service Program on Television".

Hosts

Current
Ben Tulfo (2016–2018)

Former
Veronica Alejar (a.k.a. Nikka Cleofe-Alejar) (deceased) (2016)
Alex Santos (2016–2018)
Erwin Tulfo (2017–2018)

Segments
Sumbong OFW (formerly KP OFW)- focuses on help on distressed workers in the Middle East mostly in Saudi Arabia and Kuwait.
Akto - caught in the act via CCTV or dashcams.
Hiwaga - a spin-off of BMUI produced show Kakaibang Lunas sponsored by King's Herbal drink.
Sala sa Balita (commentary)
KP Metro
KP Promdi
Travel Pass
Hoy Kengkoy
ITravel Pinas

Controversy
The Commission on Audit (COA), in its audit findings, noted that there is a memorandum of agreement on file between the tourism department and the government-owned station requiring PTNI to air a 6-minute tourism advertisement section in PTVs Kilos Pronto, plus a 3-minute DOT spot within the program. This has been criticized, since at the time of the memorandum the Department of Tourism Secretary was Wanda Tulfo Teo sister of the hosts of the show.

See also
Bitag
List of programs broadcast by UNTV
List of programs aired by People's Television Network

References

People's Television Network original programming
UNTV (Philippines) original programming
Philippine television shows
2016 Philippine television series debuts
2018 Philippine television series endings
Investigative journalism
Filipino-language television shows